Goldan Man may refer to:

 "The Golden Man", a science fiction short story by American writer Philip K. Dick
 Golden Man (Kazakhstan)